German submarine U-640 was a Type VIIC U-boat built for Nazi Germany's Kriegsmarine for service during World War II.
She was laid down on 30 October 1941 by Blohm & Voss, Hamburg as yard number 616, launched on 23 July 1942 and commissioned on 17 September 1942 under Oberleutnant zur See Karl-Heinz Nagel.

Design
German Type VIIC submarines were preceded by the shorter Type VIIB submarines. U-640 had a displacement of  when at the surface and  while submerged. She had two shafts and two  propellers.

U-640 was fitted with five  torpedo tubes (four fitted at the bow and one at the stern), fourteen torpedoes, one  SK C/35 naval gun, 220 rounds, and one twin  C/30 anti-aircraft gun. The boat had a complement of between forty-four and sixty.

Service history
The boat's career began with training at 5th U-boat Flotilla on 17 September 1942, followed by active service on 1 May 1943 as part of the 6th Flotilla.

In 1 patrol she sank no ships.

Wolfpacks
U-640 took part in one wolfpack, namely:
 Iller (12 – 14 May 1943)

Fate

Uboat.net states that U-640 was sunk on 14 May 1943 in the Atlantic Ocean in position , by depth charges from a US Catalina of VP-84. All hands were lost.

References

Bibliography

External links

German Type VIIC submarines
1942 ships
U-boats commissioned in 1942
Ships lost with all hands
U-boats sunk in 1943
U-boats sunk by depth charges
U-boats sunk by US aircraft
World War II shipwrecks in the Atlantic Ocean
World War II submarines of Germany
Ships built in Hamburg
Maritime incidents in May 1943